National Revolution and Solidarity Day was celebrated in Bangladesh on November 7, officially until 2007. This commemorates the November 1975 uprising formed by the people and regular army soldiers of Dhaka Cantonment. Khandkar Mushtaq Ahmed was removed from the Presidency by Brigadier Khaled Mosharraf. This situation led to an uprising, spearheaded by Lt.Col. Abu Taher (BD Army, Retd.) and his political group Jasad to grab power. It ended the four-day coup organised by Brigadier Khaled Mosharraf, who got killed in the aftermath, while soldiers of Dhaka Cantonment proceeded to release Major General Ziaur Rahman, who was put under house arrest at the inception of the coup by Brigadier Khaled Musharraf.

Aftermath
On this day the first Chief Justice of Bangladesh Abu Sadat Mohammad Sayem was made the President of Bangladesh and Chief Martial Law Administrator (CMLA) by Bangladesh Army and Major General Zia was made Deputy CMLA. Justice Sayem was not elected by Jatiyo Sangshad nor an acting president. Months later Justice Sayem stepped down on health reason, and Zia took the both posts of president and CMLA. Within the next year Major General Zia hanged Colonel Taher, along with several freedom fighters of the Liberation War of Bangladesh of 1971, through hasty military tribunal. This day is in the series of coups and counter-coups those occurred after the Assassination of Sheikh Mujibur Rahman, the founder President of Bangladesh on 15 August 1975.

Today
Ruling Awami League government recognize it neither as a revolutionary nor a solidarity day, as they denounce it as Freedom Fighters Killing Day.

November 7 was a national holiday in Bangladesh during the rules of autocrat Lieutenant General Hossain Mohammad Ershad and prime minister Khaleda Zia. In November 2007, caretaker government of Fakhruddin Ahmed scrapped this holiday.

See also
Military coups in Bangladesh
Ziaur Rahman
Abu Taher
 Revolution Day in other countries
 Anti-imperialism solidarity day

References 

History of Bangladesh (1971–present)
Remembrance days
Annual events in Bangladesh